"I Got a Man" is a song by American hip hop rapper Positive K. It was released in December 1992 as the first single from his debut album The Skills Dat Pay Da Bills.

Creation of the song
The song features spoken word dialog between a man and woman character, in which the man repeatedly asks the woman out and she continually rebuffs his advances by pointing out she is already in a relationship.

In creating the song, Positive K provided not only the man's dialogue but also the woman's dialogue by raising the pitch of his voice using studio technology.

Release
The single peaked at number 14 on the US Billboard Hot 100 on the chart week of March 20, 1993, making it the rapper's only Top 40 hit. It sold over 500,000 copies and was certified gold by the Recording Industry Association of America.

Music video
There were two music videos for "I Got a Man". The first version was directed by Hype Williams, while the second version was directed by Jeff Byrd.

Samples
The music samples the following:
 the 1980 disco single "Rescue Me" by A Taste of Honey
 the song "Spread Love" by the a cappella group Take 6
 the song "High Power Rap" by the rap group Crash Crew
 the electric guitar riff from "Mama Used To Say" by Junior
 the horn from "Get Up and Dance" by Freedom
 The spoken intro of the song ("How can the same shit happen to the same guy twice?") is sampled from the 1990 film Die Hard 2 in which John McClane (played by Bruce Willis) complains about his bad luck.
the song "Kuff" by dancehall artist  Shelly Thunder

Tributes to the song
In 1999, Chanté Moore and Jermaine Dupri used an interpolation of the song on their remix of "Chanté's Got a Man".

Charts

Weekly charts

Year-end charts

References

1992 debut singles
1992 songs
Island Records singles